Dynamic Party was a Nigerian political party headed by the mathematician and erudite scholar Chike Obi. It was inaugurated in Ibadan on April 7, 1951. The party embraced Kemalism, and was cautious about the early movement towards self-government.

The party was one of the first pre-independence parties to publish a well-organized manifesto. In its manifesto, it sought to contest the mad rush towards self-government by the Action Group, embrace cooperation with Europeans and Americans, promote national loyalty and improve communications in Nigerian divisions, starting from Esan, Egbado and Ekiti.

Chike Obi summarized his views of Nigerian Kemalism as 
Some of the party's salient points included the recommendation and setting up of three military training schools and an 'institute of guerrilla warfare'. It also advocated the formation of a West African Republic made up of most of French, British, Spanish, and Portuguese West Africa, a West African 'Monroe Doctrine', and a defensive alliance with India against South Africa.

References
W. J. M. Mackenzie, Kenneth Robinson; Five Elections in Africa, Oxford University Press (1960).
Kalu Ezera; Constitutional Developments in Nigeria: An Analytical Study of Nigeria's Constitution-Making Developments and the Historical and Political Factors That Affected Constitutional Change, Cambridge at the University Press (1960).
Related worksOgbonnia, SKC, (2007). Political Party System and Effective Leadership in Nigeria: A Contingency ApproachClassic 211.20.11.205:8080/edissstat/customPDFList?CusNO=0032&NO=170 - 43k - de:Liste der politischen Parteien in Nigeria

Defunct political parties in Nigeria
Political parties established in 1951
1951 establishments in Nigeria